Elene may refer to:

Elene, an Old English religious poem about Saint Helena
Elene (given name), a Georgian feminine given name
Eleni Mavrou, the mayor of Nicosia, Cyprus.
Elene (village), a village belonging to the city of Zottegem, in the province of East-Flanders, Belgium